State Route 231 (SR 231) is a  north-south state highway in the hills of western Middle Tennessee. It serves to connect the towns of McEwen and Erin.

Route description

SR 231 begins in Humphreys County in downtown McEwen at an intersection with US 70/SR 1. It heads north as Main Street to pass through neighborhoods before leaving McEwen and passing northwest through farmland for several miles as Erin Road. The highway then crosses over a wooded ridge just before crossing over White Oak Creek and entering Houston County. SR 231 then winds its way northwest as McEwen Road to cross another ridge before traveling up a narrow valley, where comes to an end at an intersection with SR 13 just south of Erin. The entire route of SR 231 is a two-lane Highway and lies entirely atop the Highland Rim.

Major intersections

References

231
Transportation in Humphreys County, Tennessee
Transportation in Houston County, Tennessee